The Little Tamarack River is a tributary of the Tamarack River of Minnesota in the United States. After flowing into the Tamarack River, it flows into the Prairie River and then into the Big Sandy Lake.

See also
List of rivers of Minnesota

References

Minnesota Watersheds
USGS Hydrologic Unit Map - State of Minnesota (1974)

Rivers of Minnesota